The  region in modern Germany is where the Kurpfalz dialect is spoken. In a narrower sense, it is where the former Electoral Palatinate (the original ) was: the areas around Mannheim and Heidelberg.

The modern  does not have defined borders, which is the same for Schwaben, but the Kurpfalz and the Palatinate are separated by the Rhine.

Etymology 

The name  (Palatine) comes from Rome's Palatine Hill, topped by palaces. The name "Pfalz" origins from the name of a royal court (a ), which is similar to a castle and that  Franconian and German kings and emperors built in important locations during the times of the Merovingians and Staufers.

The count palatine of the Rhine, who was the seneschal of the Holy Roman Empire, was responsible for the holding of court (imperial Palatine). The land he ruled over was later named after his profession.

The name "Kurpfalz" emerged only after the Golden Bull of 1356, in which the functions of the prince-elector were defined for the Palatinate county by the Rhine.

Dialect 

The Kurpfälzer are usually considered to be speakers of a dialect rather than an ethnic group. The reason is that many scattered areas belonging to the historical Kurpfalz along the Oberrhein, the Mittelrhein and the Moselle, often possess their own identity. Nowadays, parts of the former electorate are located in Baden-Württemberg, Rheinland-Pfalz, Hessen, Bayern and Elsass. These divisions emerged as early as 1800 during the Coalition Wars, when the right bank of the Rhine became a part of the Baden electorate, and, the left bank went to the First French Empire and later to Bayern. Often, the definition of the Kurpfälzer is used to define these inhabitants of Baden-Württemberg as opposed to Franconia in the east, the Württemberger (i.e., Schwaben) in the south-east and the Badenern in the south. Although the Kurpfälzer are frequently associated with the Badener, they do not see themselves as such.

"Kurpfälzisch" is spoken on the right bank of the Rhine. The difference to the Pfalz dialect spoken on the left bank is minimal. The Palatinate language area extends from Mannheim and Viernheim in the north to Weinheim, Heidelberg and Wiesloch towards Bruchsal in the south. In the east, it reaches the Baden Odenwald from Neckargemünd to Eberbach, Mosbach and Sinsheim. Approximately 1,500,000 people live in the area where Kurpfälzisch language is spoken.

History 

The historical Electoral Palatinate has its roots in the Rhenish-Lorraine Palatinate, the core areas of which country were initially located further to the north. The territory was moved later to the south, where it remained until its division, as a result of the house of the Ezzonids dying out in the 11th century. After County of Palatine had been allotted to various ruling houses, the rule of the Wittelsbacher began in the 13th century. Through this family, the County Palatine, which was soon to be called "Kurpfalz", gained great political importance in Southern Germany. After the Bavarian Wittelsbacher lineage died out, the Electorate of Bavaria went to the Palatine lineage in 1777. As a result, the Electorate of Palatinate-Bavaria was formed until the division of the Electoral Palatinate. The part of the Palatinate which is located on the left side of the Rhine became French during the French revolutionary wars but later became part of the kingdom of Bavaria after the subversion of Napoleon Bonaparte. The core territory of the Electoral Palatinate between the Rhine and the Neckar became part of the Grand Dutchy of Baden because of the Reichsdeputationshauptschluss in 1803 and shared its history from that point onwards (see Baden in the 19th century).

During the 20th and 21st centuries 

Mannheim's mayor, Hermann Heimerich, attempted to overcome the division of the old Electoral Palatinate in 1948, which ultimately failed. One reason for this was that, because of their unity, the South German territorial states had an advantage over the divided character of the Electoral Palatinate. Cities like Worms, Speyer or Bruchsal could not identify themselves with the historical Electoral Palatinate.

In 2005, the Rhine-Neckar Metropolitan Region was formed through a treaty which aimed to strengthen and facilitate transnational cooperation. This brought the old Electoral Palatinate closer together again.

Influence

Coat of arms 

The coat of arms of the historical Electoral Palatinate can be found in a number of coats of arms, however, mostly without the white and blue diamond of the Wittelsbacher. From a heraldic perspective, the Electoral Palatinate plays a subordinate role to the Coat of arms of Baden-Württemberg.

See List of coats of arms with the Palatine Lion.

Other influences 

 Kurpfalzbrücke – one of the Neckarbridges of Mannheim built between 1947 and 1950
 Kurpfälzisches orchestra – is considered the successor to the "Hofkapelle electorate" of the elector Karl Theodor
 Kurpfälzisches Museum – Museum with an archeological section in Heidelberg
 Kurpfalz-Park – an amusement and animal park in Wachenheim (Rheinland-Pfalz)
 Hockenheimring – former name of today's motorsport and race track Hockenheimring Baden-Württemberg
 Kurpfälzisches Winzerfest Wiesloch – annual wine festival in Wiesloch
 Kurpfalz-Centrum – Administrative and shopping center in Leimener

Some companies also have their origin or a branch in the Kurpfalz and they also carry the Kurpfalz name (for example Porsche in Kurpfalz).

The local comedians Bülent Ceylan, Christian Habekost, Elsbeth Janda, Josefine Lössl, Hans-Peter Schwöbel and Arnim Töpel, as well as the local singer Joana, Joy Fleming are all known beyond the Kurpfalz borders.

Literature 
 Schweickert, Alexander: Kurpfalz, Kohlhammer Verlag 1997, 
 Schaab, Meinhard: Geschichte der Kurpfalz, Bd. 1 Mittelalter, Kohlhammer Verlag 1988, 
 Schaab, Meinhard: Geschichte der Kurpfalz, Bd. 2 Neuzeit, Kohlhammer Verlag 1992,

References 

Geography of Baden-Württemberg
Regions of Germany